Breitenstein may refer to:

Breitenstein, Lower Austria
Breitenstein, a locality (Ortschaft) in Aigen-Schlägl, Upper Austria, Austria
Breitenstein, Saxony-Anhalt, a municipality in Germany
Breitenstein (mountain), a mountain in the Bavarian Alps
Breitenstein (Swabian Alb), a mountain in Baden-Württemberg, Germany
Breitenstein, a small town in Weil im Schönbuch, Baden-Württemberg, in Germany